Huff Racing is an American stock car racing team that currently competes in the ARCA Menards Series, fielding the No. 36 Ford Fusion part-time for Ryan Huff and Jon Garrett. The team is owned by James Huff.

ARCA Menards Series

Car No. 36 history 

Starting in the 2021 General Tire 200, Ryan Huff would start his own team, driving the No. 36, and finishing 14th. At the 2021 General Tire AnywhereIsPossible 200, he scored his first ever top-10 finish.

Car No. 36 results

References

Stock car racing